Chicago XXXV: The Nashville Sessions is the twenty-third studio album, and thirty-fifth overall album by the band Chicago, released in 2013.  Recorded at The Sound Kitchen between tour stops, The Nashville Sessions is a collection of new recordings of songs from the band's back catalogue.

Track listing

Personnel
Adapted from the album liner notes.

Chicago
Robert Lamm – keyboards, lead and backing vocals
Lee Loughnane – trumpet
James Pankow – trombone
Walter Parazaider – woodwinds
Jason Scheff – bass, lead and backing vocals
Tris Imboden – drums, percussion
Keith Howland – guitar, lead and backing vocals

Production
Kevin Beamish – recording and mix engineer
Matt Coles – overdub engineer
Adam Deane – overdub engineer
Keith Howland – overdub engineer
Jason Scheff – overdub engineer

References

2013 albums
Chicago (band) albums